Lam Wah Ee Hospital is a 700 bedded tertiary acute care hospital located at 141 Jalan Tan Sri Teh Ewe Lim, Penang, Malaysia. This not-for-profit private hospital is accredited by the Malaysian Society for Quality in Health. The Hospital started as a provider of traditional Chinese Medicine treatment in 1883 while the Western Medicine division commenced operations in 1983.

It owns Lam Wah Ee Nursing College, the first private nursing college in northern region of Peninsular Malaysia.

Specialties

Anaesthesiology 
Cardiology 
Cardiothoracic Surgery 
Cosmetic Surgery
Dentistry 
Dermatology 
Ear, Nose and Throat Surgery
Emergency Medicine
Endocrinology 
Gastroenterology / Hepatology
General Surgery 
Internal Medicine 
Neonatology 
Neurosurgery
Nephrology
Obstetrics and Gynaecology
Ophthalmology 
Orthopaedics Surgery
Paediatrics 
Paediatric Surgery
Paediatric Neurology 
Pathology 
Prosthodontics 
Psychiatry 
Radiology 
Respiratory
Sports Injury Surgery
Spine Injury Surgery
Traumatology 
Urology

See also
 Healthcare in Malaysia
 Lam Wah Ee Nursing College

References

External links
Official Facebook Page
Official Website

Picture

Hospitals in Penang
Hospitals established in 1883